was the seventh of ten s built for the Imperial Japanese Navy in the mid-1930s under the Circle Two Supplementary Naval Expansion Program (Maru Ni Keikaku).

History
The Asashio-class destroyers were larger and more capable that the preceding , as Japanese naval architects were no longer constrained by the provisions of the London Naval Treaty. These light cruiser-sized vessels were designed to take advantage of Japan’s lead in torpedo technology, and to accompany the Japanese main striking force and in both day and night attacks against the United States Navy as it advanced across the Pacific Ocean, according to Japanese naval strategic projections. Despite being one of the most powerful classes of destroyers in the world at the time of their completion, none survived the Pacific War.

Natsugumo, built at the Sasebo Naval Arsenal was laid down on 1 July 1936, launched on 26 May 1937 and commissioned on 10 February 1938.

Operational history
At the time of the attack on Pearl Harbor, Natsugumo, under the command of Lieutenant Commander Moritaro Tsukamoto, was assigned to Destroyer Division 9 (Desdiv 9), and a member of Destroyer Squadron 4 (Desron 4) of the IJN 2nd Fleet, escorting the Philippines invasion forces to Vigan and Lingayen. She then assisted in the landings of Japanese forces at Tarakan, Balikpapan, Makassar and Java in the Netherlands East Indies. During the Battle of the Java Sea of 27 February, she was on detached duty escorting the troop convoy and thus did not see combat. However, on 1 March, she damaged the submarine  with depth charges.

Natsugumo participated in the Battle of Christmas Island from 31 March–10 April, escorting the damaged cruiser  to Singapore, and then returning to Yokosuka on April 12 for repairs.

Natsugumo joined the escort for Admiral Nobutake Kondō’s Midway Invasion Force during the Battle of Midway from 4–6 June 1942. Afterwards, she was reassigned to the Ominato Naval District and assigned to patrols of the Kurile Islands and north Pacific to mid-July. However, on 19 July, she received orders to escort the cruiser  from Kure to Truk. From Truk, she made a transport run to Kwajalein and returned to Yokosuka by 8 August.

On 11 August, Natsugumo departed Yokosuka for Truk, and was part of the escort for the aircraft carrier  at the Battle of the Eastern Solomons on 24 August. She was assigned to patrols out of Truk in September, and ordered to Shortland Island in October. During the month of October, she made four “Tokyo Express transport runs to Guadalcanal. On the fourth run, while escorting  and Chitose, she went to the assistance of the destroyer  which itself had become the victim of early morning air raids while attempting to assist survivors of the heavy cruiser , sunk during the previous night's Battle of Cape Esperance. The attack killed 16 crewmen, including her captain (LtCdr Moritaro Tsukamoto); the destroyer  took off her 176 survivors  She was removed from the navy list on 15 November 1942.

Notes

References

External links
 CombinedFleet.com: Asashio-class destroyers
Natsugumo history
GlobalSecurity.org: Asashio class destroyers
Materials of the Imperial Japanese Navy

Asashio-class destroyers
Ships built by Sasebo Naval Arsenal
World War II destroyers of Japan
Destroyers sunk by aircraft
1937 ships
Maritime incidents in October 1942
Shipwrecks in the Solomon Sea
Ships sunk by US aircraft